Alycidae is a family of mites, or endeostigs, in the suborder Endeostigmata. There are at least 6 genera in Alycidae.

Genera
These six genera belong to the family Alycidae:
 Alycus C.L.Koch, 1842
 Amphialycus Zachvatkin, 1949
 Coccalicus Willmann, 1952
 Laminamichaelia Uusitalo, 2010
 Orthacarus Zachvatkin, 1949
 Petralycus Grandjean, 1943

References

Further reading

 
 
 

Sarcoptiformes
Acari families